Halmar Friesen Racing, also known as Halmar Racing Team, is an American professional stock car racing and dirt track racing team that currently competes in the NASCAR Craftsman Truck Series, fielding the No. 52 Toyota Tundra full-time for Stewart Friesen and fielding the No. 62 part-time for Jessica Friesen and Layne Riggs. The team also fields modified racing cars for several drivers around the Northeastern United States including for Stewart and Jessica Friesen themselves.

Craftsman Truck Series

Truck No. 16, 52 history

Stewart Friesen (2016–present) 
The team ran part-time in 2016, using the No. 16 and entering the short track races with Friesen as driver. For the team's debut race at Eldora, the truck had a body from Kyle Busch Motorsports and an engine from Richard Childress Racing.

In 2017, the team announced plans to run the full Truck Series schedule as Halmar Friesen Racing with Friesen driving the renumbered No. 52 truck. HFR hired Cup Series team owner Tommy Baldwin Jr. of Tommy Baldwin Racing (which reduced from a full-time to a part-time Cup Series schedule in 2017) to serve as team manager.

After the June Texas race, the team announced a two-race hiatus and that they would return in Kentucky in July.

Friesen captured the pole for the 2017 Eldora Dirt Derby and finished second to Matt Crafton in the race after leading over half of the laps.

On August 23, 2017, HFR announced the end of its partnership with Baldwin and the start of a new technical alliance with GMS Racing. The same day the team announce that Tommy Baldwin's brother in law, longtime NASCAR Crew Chief, Trip Bruce would take over running the team and has remained a staple at HFR from 2018 to 2021 as Stewart's Crew Chief and in 2022 moved into the role of Director of Competition. 

On August 16, 2018, Friesen made the truck series playoffs for the first time in the organization's history.

On July 11, 2019, NASCAR confiscated the No. 52 truck before the Kentucky race after discovering an issue with the firewall during pre-race inspection. The team was able to use their backup truck, which finished second in the race. On August 1, 2019, Friesen finally broke through to win his first career NASCAR Gander Outdoors Truck Series race at Eldora. Friesen would also go onto win at Phoenix Raceway later that year.

On December 3, 2019, it was announced that the team would switch from Chevrolet to Toyota in an alliance with Kyle Busch Motorsports starting in 2020, thus ending their previous alliance with GMS Racing. In 2020, after Friesen missed the playoffs, he decided to skip the race at Kansas Speedway In October in order to compete in a dirt race on the same day. Timothy Peters would fill in for Friesen in the No. 52 in the Truck Series race. Friesen would run his fourth full season in the Truck Series in 2021 and would make the playoffs again despite not winning any races that year. Friesen ran his fifth full season in the Truck Series in 2022 in the No. 52 truck. Friesen would win at Texas Motor Speedway for his third career Truck Series win.

Truck No. 52 results

Truck No. 62 history

Jessica Friesen (2021) 
On March 11, 2021, Jessica Friesen announced that she would make her Truck Series debut in the Pinty's Dirt Truck Race alongside her husband in the No. 62. However, she failed to qualify after rain washed out the heat races. Instead, she would make her debut in the other dirt race for the Truck Series at Knoxville Raceway, the Corn Belt 150.

Jessica Friesen, Todd Bodine, and Layne Riggs (2022) 
After having not driven in NASCAR for five years, Todd Bodine returned to the Truck Series to drive for Halmar Friesen Racing in the No. 62 at Las Vegas. The CEO of series title sponsor Camping World, Marcus Lemonis, stated that Camping World would sponsor Bodine for 6 races to get him to 800 overall starts in NASCAR. Bodine would complete in the 6 races during which he would finish 5 races, lead 3 laps, and score a top ten finish at Darlington Raceway. In his 800th and final overall NASCAR at Pocono Raceway, Bodine would finish 36th after he crashed 12 laps into the race. On March 28, 2022, the team announced that Jessica Friesen would return to drive the No. 62 in the two dirt races again. She would fail to qualify at Bristol for the second consecutive year. She would go onto to race at Knoxville where she had a rollover crash after hitting the tracks berm that was not shown in the fox sports broadcast of the race.

In July 2022 it was announced that NASCAR Advance Auto Parts Weekly Series driver Layne Riggs would make his debut driving the truck at the 2022 race at Lucas Oil Indianapolis Raceway Park and would finish 7th, at the next race at Richmond Raceway he would qualify 4th but would finish 19th 2 laps down. Riggs would make his final start of the year at the season finale at Phoenix Raceway where he would qualify 2nd and lead five laps early in the race, but he would later drop back and finish 13th.

Truck No. 62 results

References

External links
 
 

NASCAR teams